Crown Pacific Partners, L.P. was a publicly traded partnership founded in 1988 which at its peak owned about 800,000 acres (3,000 km²) of timberland, half in Oregon and the rest in Washington, Idaho, and Montana. It also held several sawmills (including one in Gilchrist, Oregon), a wood chip plant, and lumber yards in the Pacific Northwest, with wholesale marketing and sales office in states such as California, Utah, and Arizona.

The partnership went public in 1994, trading under the stock symbol CRO on the New York Stock Exchange.  It filed for Chapter 11 bankruptcy in June 2003, with its remaining assets, 520,000 acres (2,100 km²) in Washington and Oregon, taken over by creditors in December 2004, who formed Cascade Timberlands, LLC.

References

External links 
 Archives of http://www.crownpacificpartners.com/, held by the Internet Archive
 Creditors bid adieu to Crown Pacific, a December 2004 article from the Portland Tribune
 Crown Pacific Partners / Bush administration, a  June 2004 article from Willamette Week

Defunct companies based in Oregon
Companies established in 1988
1988 establishments in Oregon
2004 disestablishments in Oregon